These are the official results of the Men's 50 metres Freestyle event at the 1995 FINA Short Course World Championships, held in Rio de Janeiro, Brazil.

Finals

Qualifying heats

See also
1996 Men's Olympic Games 50m Freestyle
1995 Men's European LC Championships 50m Freestyle
1997 Men's European LC Championships 50m Freestyle

References
 Results
 swimrankings

F